Joseph Patrick Rooney (August 28, 1898 – March 4, 1979) was a Canadian-born American professional football player. After attending high school in Virginia, Minnesota, Rooney made his professional debut in the early years of National Football League in 1923 with the Duluth Kelleys. He played for the Kelleys, Duluth Eskimos, Chicago Cardinals, Pottsville Maroons and Rock Island Independents during his 7-year career.

References

1898 births
1979 deaths
American football ends
Canadian emigrants to the United States
Canadian players of American football
Chicago Cardinals players
Duluth Eskimos players
Duluth Kelleys players
Rock Island Independents players
Pottsville Maroons players
Sportspeople from Saskatoon